St Vincent's Institute of Medical Research (SVI) is an independent Australian medical research institute located in , Melbourne, Victoria. The Institute conducts medical research into the cause, prevention and treatment of diseases that are common and have serious effects on health. These include type 1 diabetes, obesity, heart disease and type 2 diabetes, arthritis and osteoporosis, cancer and the spread of cancer, infectious diseases such as hepatitis and AIDS and Alzheimer's disease and other neurological disorders.

SVI has been directed by endocrinologist Prof. Thomas Kay since 2002.

Founded in 1951 by the Sisters of Charity, SVI is affiliated with The University of Melbourne and St Vincent's Hospital, and is a member institution of the Mary Aikenhead Ministries.

See also

Health in Australia

References

External links

St Vincent's Institute of Medical Research
1951 establishments in Australia
Research institutes established in 1951